The Cappadocian gudgeon (Gobio gymnostethus) is a species of gudgeon, a small freshwater in the family Cyprinidae. It is endemic to the Melendiz drainage in Turkey.

References

 

Gobio
Fish described in 1960